St Peter's Church is a Roman Catholic Parish church in Gloucester, Gloucestershire. It was built from 1860 to 1868 and designed by Gilbert Blount. It is situated on the corner of London Road and Black Dog Way in the centre of the city. It is a Grade II* listed building.

History

In 1788, a Roman Catholic mission was founded in Gloucester. It was served by an Fr Gildart from a house on Berkeley Street. He did so with help from a £1,000 donation from a Miss Mary Webb. In 1789, it became a parish. In 1790, a Fr John Greenaway came to serve the parish. He set about getting chapel built. It was dedicated to St Peter ad Vincula and was built on London Road. It was registered in 1792. He died in 1800 and was buried in the chapel.

In 1850, during the same year as the restoration of the English hierarchy, a Fr Leonard Calderbank became parish priest. With the increasing Catholic population of the city, he planned for a larger church to accommodate the congregation. In 1857, a £1,000 gift from a Frances Canning was given for the construction of the church and subscriptions were given by the local congregation.

The presbytery, designed by Alexander Scoles, was built in 1879–80.

Architecture
In 1859, the chapel on the site of the church was demolished. Construction on the church started in 1860. Gilbert Blount was commissioned to build a Gothic Revival church. In 1867, the neighbouring presbytery was demolished to allow space for construction of a longer nave, a tower and spire. On 8 October 1868, the church was consecrated. In 1880, a new presbytery was built.

Interior
A triptych by Mayer of Munich, acquired by Canon Case in Paris. The stained glass is by Hardman & Co. and Clayton and Bell, who also did the original painting scheme in the sanctuary and Lady Chapel. The painted high altar and reredos in the sanctuary were designed by Blount, as was the carved and arcaded circular stone pulpit, a gift of Miss Canning. In the sanctuary are the carved figures of our Lady, St Joseph, St. Gregory, St. Augustine, St. David and St. Willstan.

Parish
The church has four Sunday Masses: 6:00pm on Saturday and 9:00am, 10:00am and 5:30pm on Sunday.

See also
 Roman Catholic Diocese of Clifton

References

External links
 
 St Peter's Parish site

Roman Catholic churches in Gloucestershire
Saint Peter
Grade II* listed churches in Gloucestershire
Grade II* listed Roman Catholic churches in England
Gothic Revival church buildings in England
Gothic Revival architecture in Gloucestershire
Roman Catholic churches completed in 1868
1868 establishments in England
Gilbert Blount church buildings
19th-century Roman Catholic church buildings in the United Kingdom